The Ocros Province is one of twenty provinces of the Ancash Region in Peru.

Geography 
Some of the highest mountains of the province are listed below:are listed below:

Political division
Ocros is divided into ten districts, which are:
 Acas 
 Cajamarquilla 
 Carhuapampa 
 Cochas 
 Congas 
 Llipa 
 Ocros 
 San Cristóbal de Rajan 
 San Pedro 
 Santiago de Chilcas

See also 
 Yanaqi - Qillqamarka

References

External links
  Official website of the Ocros Province

Ocros Province